The Barnsley-Dearne Valley Built-up area is an urban area which extends from the town of Barnsley to Mexborough in South Yorkshire, England. The area takes in parts of the boroughs of Barnsley, Doncaster and Rotherham. The area includes villages and towns that lie in the Dearne and Rother Valleys. The area was recorded at having a population of 223,281.

According to the 2011 census, the gender makeup of the population was 109,684 male and 113,597 female. The ethnic makeup of the whole urban area was under 98% white and only 1% Asian. Other ethnic minorities were just under 1%. The religious make up of the whole area was:
69.8 – Religious
23.8 – Irreligious
6.4 – Not stated

References

Barnsley
Metropolitan Borough of Barnsley
Metropolitan Borough of Rotherham
South Yorkshire
Urban areas of England